State Road 33 (SR 33) is a state highway running through Lake and Polk counties in Florida.

Route description

State Road 33 begins in Lakeland off U.S. Route 92 (US 92) east of the intersection with US 98 and heads north along the vicinity of the west bank of Lake Parker. North of there it curves to the northeast and has one of two interchanges with Interstate 4 (I-4). The first interchange (Exit 33) provides westbound access via North Socrum Loop Road (CR 582), and eastbound access directly to SR 33. The route turns more to the east away from I-4, until it curves north at the northern terminus of Florida State Road 569. It has an encounter at the second interchange with I-4 (Exit 38) where it actually crosses under the interstate. The road continues northeast to Polk City where it curves back towards the north at a bridge over a former Seaboard Air Line Railroad line (now the Auburndale TECO Trail and General James A. Van Fleet State Trail) just at the northwestern coast of Lake Agnes. From there, it traverses through mostly rural farmland into Lake County and Groveland. In Groveland, it intersects and begins a  concurrency with SR 50, up to Mascotte.  Now a county road, CR 33 continues through another  or so of rural farmland, passes under Florida's Turnpike, and ends on US 27 in Okahumpka.

Major intersections

References

External links

033
033
033
033